Marko Koivuranta (born 10 March 1978) is a Finnish former footballer who most recently played for RoPS; he formerly played for FC Jazz, AC Oulu and FC YPA.

After Finnish Premier League season 2009 Koivuranta decided to retire his footballing career.

Koivuranta has also played 18 matches in Finnish national futsal team.

External links
  at rops.fi
  at veikkausliiga.com

References

1978 births
Living people
Finnish footballers
Association football defenders
Veikkausliiga players
Rovaniemen Palloseura players
FC Jazz players
AC Oulu players
People from Rovaniemi
FC YPA players
Sportspeople from Lapland (Finland)